Snake Ridge is a serpentine ridge, 4 nautical miles (7 km) long, adjoining the northwest extremity of Mackin Table in the Patuxent Range, Pensacola Mountains. Mapped by United States Geological Survey (USGS) from surveys and U.S. Navy air photos, 1956–66. The descriptive name was proposed by Dwight L. Schmidt, USGS geologist to these mountains, 1962–66.

Ridges of Queen Elizabeth Land